Covidien was an Irish-headquartered global health care products company and manufacturer of medical devices and supplies. Covidien became an independent publicly traded company after being spun off from Tyco International in 2007. It was purchased by Medtronic in a transaction that closed in 2015. The now-merged company is headquartered in Ireland, where Covidien was based.

History
In 2007, Covidien was formed when Tyco International spun off its health care business.

In 2012, Covidien acquired Newport Medical Instruments, a small ventilator manufacturer supplier. Newport Medical Instruments had been contracted in 2006 by the U.S. Department of Health and Human Services' Biomedical Advanced Research and Development Authority to design a cheap, portable ventilator. At the time, Newport Medical Instruments had three working prototypes produced, and was on schedule to file for market approval late 2013. Covidien then effectively halted the project, subsequently exiting the contract, citing the reason that it was not profitable enough. Government officials and other medical equipment suppliers suspected that the Newport acquisition was largely done to prevent a cheaper product from undermining Covidien's existing ventilator business.  This contributed to the shortage of ventilators during the COVID-19 pandemic.

In October 2013, Covidien sold its Confluent Surgical product line for $235 million to Integra LifeSciences, including its DuraSeal, VascuSeal and SprayShield products.

In January 2014, Covidien acquired WEM Electronic Equipment, based in Ribeirão Preto, Brazil.

In June 2014, Covidien agreed to be acquired by Medtronic for $42.9 billion.

References

External links 
 Covidien.com
 Covidien Company Profile at MarketWatch
 Key Statistics

Medtronic
Tyco International
Health care companies of Ireland
Companies formerly listed on the New York Stock Exchange
Multinational companies
Defunct pharmaceutical companies of the United States
Companies based in Massachusetts
Pharmaceutical companies established in 2007
Health care companies established in 2007
Corporate spin-offs
2015 mergers and acquisitions
Tax inversions